The pars plana (also known as orbicularis ciliaris ) (Latin: flat portion) is part of the ciliary body in the uvea (or vascular tunic), the middle layer of the three layers that comprise the eye.

It is about 4 mm long, located near the junction of the iris and sclera, and is scalloped in appearance.

The pars plana may not have a function in the post-fetal period, making this a good site of entry for ophthalmic surgery of the posterior segment of eyeball; this surgery is known as pars plana vitrectomy.

References

Human eye anatomy